Grand Oaks High School is a high school in unincorporated Montgomery County, Texas, in the United States. The school opened in August 2018 as the sixth high school within Conroe Independent School District. The school was built to alleviate overcrowding at Oak Ridge High School.

Demographics
The school enrolled 1,241 students in 9th and 10th grade in its first year. The school's capacity is approximately 3,000 students.

History
On November 3, 2015, voters within Conroe ISD's attendance zone voted in favor of a $487 million bond. Part of the bond package included the construction of a high school within the Oak Ridge High School feeder zone. The new high school was included to reduce enrollment at Oak Ridge High School. In the 2016–2017 school year, Oak Ridge enrolled 4,119 students, while the school district listed the school capacity as 3,650. Due to the opening of Grand Oaks High School, the district estimated that enrollment at Oak Ridge would drop to 2,270 by the year 2020.

The Grand Oaks campus had a cost of $154 million. In its first year, Grand Oaks enrolled only 9th and 10th grade students. Each subsequent year, the school added one grade to the campus, graduating its first class in 2021.

The dedication ceremony occurred on October 22, 2018.

Academics
For the 2018–2019 school year, Grand Oaks received an A grade from the Texas Education Agency.

Athletics
In its inaugural year, Grand Oaks competed in UIL class 5A in individual sports such as cross country, track, tennis, wrestling, and swimming. All team sports except football became varsity sports in 2019; football started competing at the varsity level in 2020.

Feeder schools 
Feeder elementary schools (K-4) to Grand Oaks High School include:

 Bradley
 Birnham Woods
 Snyder
 Broadway
 Ford (Fox Run & Spring Creek Pines only)

Feeder intermediate schools (5-6) to Grand Oaks High School include:

 Clark
 Cox

Feeder junior high schools (7-8) to Grand Oaks High School include:

 York

References

External links
Grand Oaks High School
"Update on Rezoning for Lucille J. Bradley Elementary, Flex 18, and Grand Oaks High School." Conroe Independent School District. January 10, 2017.

Conroe Independent School District high schools
Educational institutions established in 2018
2018 establishments in Texas